Strotactinus is an extinct genus of trilobite in the family Pliomeridae. There is one described species in Strotactinus, S. insularis.

References

Pliomeridae
Articles created by Qbugbot